Ordgarius hobsoni is a species of spider of the genus Ordgarius in the family Araneidae. One of a number of spiders known as a bolas spider, it is found in India, Sri Lanka, China, and Japan.

Unlike many araneids, they do not spin a typical orb web. Instead, they hunt by using a sticky 'capture blob' of silk on the end of a line, known as a 'bolas', hence the English name.

See also 
 List of Araneidae species

References

Araneidae
Spiders of Asia
Spiders described in 1877